Duckington is a civil parish in Cheshire West and Chester, England.  It contains three buildings that are recorded in the National Heritage List for England as designated listed buildings, all of which are at Grade II.  This grade is the lowest of the three gradings given to listed buildings and is applied to "buildings of national importance and special interest".  Apart from the village of Duckington, the parish is entirely rural.  All the listed buildings are structures associated with Bank Farm.

See also
Listed buildings in Carden
Listed buildings in Larkton
Listed buildings in Tilston
Listed buildings in Bickerton
Listed buildings in Broxton

References

Listed buildings in Cheshire West and Chester
Lists of listed buildings in Cheshire